Henry George (18 February 1891 – 6 January 1976) was a Belgian track cycling racer who competed in the 1920 Summer Olympics.

During the First World War, Henry George served in the Belgian army and was part of the Belgian Expeditionary Corps in Russia, fighting on the Eastern Front along with Imperial Russian forces.

In 1920 George won the gold medal in the 50 kilometres competition.

References

External links
profile

1891 births
1976 deaths
Belgian male cyclists
Belgian track cyclists
Olympic cyclists of Belgium
Cyclists at the 1920 Summer Olympics
Olympic gold medalists for Belgium
Olympic medalists in cycling
Sportspeople from Charleroi
Cyclists from Hainaut (province)
Medalists at the 1920 Summer Olympics
20th-century Belgian people